Zimić  is a village in Croatia.

References 

Populated places in Karlovac County